John Hammond is an American actor born October 6, 1955. As a virtual unknown he landed the lead role in the 1982 miniseries, The Blue and the Gray as fictional Virginia war-artist John Geyser, then followed it up with lead role in the 1983 family film The Prodigal.

References

External links

 

Living people
Year of birth missing (living people)